Da jiu-jia is a kind of snack in Tengchong city, Yunnan province. Da jiu-jia is the most famous in the east Hujiawan suburban.

Recipe
First, make a piece of bait blocks with good quality sticky rice, slice it into strips, then fry it with fresh meat, ham, eggs, mushrooms, fresh vegetable and pickled pepper, you could get the snack which tastes soft and sweet.

History
It is said that Zhu Youlang, an emperor of Ming Dynasty, arrived in Tengchong after being chased by enemy troops. At that time he had been very hungry and tired, local villagers gave him some delicious fried food which was named bait blocks, the food was applauded by the emperor, he said that it saved his life. This is the reason why the snack was called Da jiu-jia (that means Great Rescue in Chinese).

References

Yunnan cuisine